Esther Bensusan Pissarro (12 November 1870 – 20 November 1951) was a British wood-engraver, designer, and printer.

Biography
Pissarro née Bensusan was born on 12 November 1870, the sister of Samuel L. Bensusan. She studied at the Crystal Palace School of Art. On 10 August 1892 she married fellow artist Lucien Pissarro (1863–1944) with whom she had one daughter, the artist Orovida Camille Pissarro (1893–1968). In 1894, inspired by William Morris's Kelmscott Press, Esther and Lucien Pissarro established the Eragny Press. The Eragny Press produced books illustrated with wood engravings.  Esther assisted with creating the wood engravings from Lucien's designs. 

Pissarro died on 20 November 1951. Work by Esther and Lucien Pissarro are in the Tate and the Royal Academy of Arts.

References

External links

1870 births
1951 deaths
20th-century British women artists
19th-century British women artists
English women painters
19th-century English women
19th-century English people
20th-century English women
20th-century English people